Human Hounds is a 1916 American silent comedy film starring Oliver Hardy.

Cast
 Oliver Hardy as Plump (as Babe Hardy)
 Billy Ruge as Runt
 Bert Tracy as General Debility
 Ray Godfrey as Mrs. Debility
 Joe Cohen as Count de Lummox
 Madge Cohen as Countess de Lummox

See also
 List of American films of 1916
 Oliver Hardy filmography

External links

1916 films
1916 short films
American silent short films
American black-and-white films
1916 comedy films
Silent American comedy films
American comedy short films
1910s American films
1910s English-language films